Cold Waters may refer to:

Cold Waters (album), an album by South African rapper PdotO
Cold Waters (video game), a 2017 submarine simulator game by Killerfish Games

See also
 Cold Water (disambiguation)